War Child Presents Heroes is a 2009 charity album devoted to the War Child charity's aid efforts in war-stricken areas, such as Iraq, Uganda, Afghanistan and the Democratic Republic of Congo. With a theme of "placing faith in the next generation," the concept of the album is to have music legends select a track from their own canon and nominate an artist from the next generation to create a modern reworking of that song.

The album was recorded over six months in London, Manchester, Paris, Berlin, New York, and Los Angeles, and mastered at Abbey Road Studios in North London. Previous War Child charity albums include The Help Album (1995), 1 Love (2002), Hope (2003) and Help!: A Day in the Life (2005).

Release
While initial reports indicated the album would be released on 24 November 2008, on 7 October, it was announced that the release date would be pushed back to February 2009 due to an overwhelming interest from musicians hoping to contribute to the compilation. On 17 December, a release date of 16 February 2009 was announced.

Track listing
Original artists listed in parentheses.

European Edition
Beck – "Leopard-Skin Pill-Box Hat" (Bob Dylan)
Scissor Sisters – "Do the Strand" (Roxy Music)
Lily Allen and Mick Jones – "Straight to Hell" (The Clash)
Duffy – "Live and Let Die" (Paul McCartney and Wings)
Elbow – "Running to Stand Still" (U2)
TV on the Radio – "Heroes" (David Bowie)
Hot Chip – "Transmission" (Joy Division)
The Kooks – "Victoria" (The Kinks)
Estelle – "Superstition" (Stevie Wonder)
Rufus Wainwright – "Wonderful/Song For Children" (Brian Wilson)
Peaches – "Search and Destroy" (The Stooges)
The Hold Steady – "Atlantic City" (Bruce Springsteen)
The Like – "You Belong to Me" (Elvis Costello)
Yeah Yeah Yeahs – "Sheena Is a Punk Rocker" (Ramones)
Franz Ferdinand – "Call Me" (Live) (Blondie)

North American Edition
The album has a different sequence in North America, including an additional track by Adam Cohen.

Beck – "Leopard-Skin Pill-Box Hat" (Bob Dylan)
The Kooks – "Victoria" (The Kinks)
The Hold Steady – "Atlantic City" (Bruce Springsteen)
Hot Chip – "Transmission" (Joy Division)
Lily Allen and Mick Jones – "Straight to Hell" (The Clash)
Yeah Yeah Yeahs – "Sheena Is a Punk Rocker" (Ramones)
Franz Ferdinand – "Call Me" (Live) (Blondie)
Duffy – "Live and Let Die" (Paul McCartney and Wings)
Estelle – "Superstition" (Stevie Wonder)
Rufus Wainwright – "Wonderful/Song For Children" (Brian Wilson)
Scissor Sisters – "Do the Strand" (Roxy Music)
Peaches – "Search and Destroy" (The Stooges)
Adam Cohen – "Take This Waltz" (Leonard Cohen)
Elbow – "Running to Stand Still" (U2)
The Like – "You Belong to Me" (Elvis Costello)
TV on the Radio – "Heroes" (David Bowie)

References

External links
War Child's official Heroes webpage
The official UK mini-site for the Heroes album
 War Child Music
 War Child International
 War Child Canada
 War Child Holland
 War Child UK

2009 compilation albums
Parlophone compilation albums
War Child albums